Dinobryaceae is a family of algae in the order Chromulinales comprising approximately 23 genera.

Genera
The following genera included in the family Dinobryaceae: Angulochrysis, Arthrochrysis, Arthropyxis, Chrysococcus, Chrysolykos, Codonobotrys, Codonodendron, Conradocystis, Dinobryon, Epipyxis, Hyalobryon, Kephyrion, Lepochromulina, Ollicola, Porochrysis, Poteriochroomonas, Pseudokephyrion, Sphaerobryon, Stenocodon, Stokesiella, Stylochrysalis, Stylopyxis, and Woronichiniella.

References

Chrysophyceae
Heterokont families
Algae families
Taxa named by Christian Gottfried Ehrenberg